Golam Mohiuddin Chowdhury is a retired Major General of Bangladesh Army.

Early life 
Chowdhury graduated from Dhaka Dental College in 1982 with a Bachelor of Dental Surgery. He studied Oral & Maxillofacial Surgery at the Armed Forces Institute of Dentistry in Pakistan.

Career 
Chowdhury joined Bangladesh Army as an Oral & Maxillofacial Surgeon in 1994.

Chowdhury finished his Fellow of the college of physicians & surgeons (FCPS) on 1 July 2007. He was stationed at the Combined Military Hospital in Dhaka.

Chowdhury also works as a consultant at the Evercare Hospital Dhaka.

References 

Living people
Bangladesh Army generals
Year of birth missing (living people)
Bangladeshi dentists